Carl Joys Lomen (July 13, 1880 – August 16, 1965) was an American entrepreneur and photographer. He was known as The Reindeer King of Alaska, because of his role in "organizing, promoting, marketing, and lobbying for the reindeer industry" in the first decades of the 20th century, as president of the Lomen Company.

In 1954, he published his autobiography, Fifty Years in Alaska (New York: David McKay). He died on  August 16, 1965.

References

External links 
 Lomen Brothers Alaska Photographs
 Guide to the Walter B. Beals Album on Roald Amundsen 1906–1929

20th-century American businesspeople
People from Nome, Alaska
1880 births
1965 deaths
20th-century American photographers